The KMC Football Stadium, formerly known as the CDGK Stadium, is an association football stadium in Karachi, Pakistan, with a capacity of 15,000.  It belongs to the Karachi Municipal Corporation. The venue hosted the 2009 national league's football final, with 15,000 people in attendance. Karachi United, the first Pakistani football club with almost 100,000 followers on Facebook, use the stadium for some games. FC Karachi also use the stadium for some of their home games.

KMC is one of the two venues for the 2021 National Women Football Championship.

See also
 List of stadiums by capacity
 List of stadiums in Pakistan
 List of cricket grounds in Pakistan
 List of sports venues in Karachi
 List of sports venues in Lahore
 List of sports venues in Faisalabad

External links
Stadium picture

References

Football venues in Pakistan
Stadiums in Karachi
Multi-purpose stadiums in Pakistan